1st AIBA European Olympic Boxing Qualifying Tournament was held from February 25 – March 1, 2008 in Roseto degli Abruzzi-Pescara, Italy. During the tournament 250 boxers from 40 countries competed for 26 Olympic qualifying places in 11 different weight categories.

Qualifying

40 teams participated in this tournament: 
 
  
  
  
  
  
  
  
  
  
  
  
  
  
  
  
  (ENG - 7), (SCO - 4), (WAL - 2) 
  
  
  
 
  
  
  
  
  
  
  
  
  
  
  
  
  
  
  
  
  
  
  
 

Competition System 
The competition system of the 1st AIBA European Olympic Boxing Qualifying Tournament is the knockout round system. Each boxer fights one match per round.

Medal summary

Medal table

Key to AIBA decisions

References
1st AIBA European Olympic Boxing Qualifying Tournament 
Medal and points ranking

See also
 1st AIBA African 2008 Olympic Qualifying Tournament

Qualification for the 2008 Summer Olympics
Boxing at the 2008 Summer Olympics
International boxing competitions hosted by Italy
AIBA European 2008 Olympic Qualifying Tournament
AIBA European 2008 Olympic Qualifying Tournament
Sport in Pescara